James Herbert Jackson (27 December 1897–1964) was an English footballer who played in the Football League for Derby County and Norwich City.

References

1897 births
1964 deaths
English footballers
Association football forwards
English Football League players
Macclesfield Town F.C. players
Derby County F.C. players
Norwich City F.C. players